Andrei Rădulescu (9 February 1925 – 1992) was a Romanian football forward, referee, president of the Romanian Football Federation and a basketball player.

Career
Andrei Rădulescu was born in Bucharest, starting his career playing for the junior club Luceafărul București at age 13. In 1942, he started his senior career at Venus București, after which, he moved in Timișoara where he attended the Politehnica University of Timișoara, where he played football for the university's team, Politehnica Timișoara. During his years of playing football at Venus București and Politehnica Timișoara, Rădulescu also played basketball in regional championships for Viforul Dacia II București and RGM Timișoara, a activity which he abandoned in 1948, after Politehnica Timișoara won the promotion in the first league at the requirement of the team's management in order to avoid injuries. From 1950 until 1954, Rădulescu played for Rapid București, managing to become the top goalscorer of the 1950 Divizia A season with 18 goals scored in 22 matches. In 1957, Rădulescu became a football referee, arbitrating matches in the Romanian top-division Divizia A and the 1960 Cupa României Final. Rădulescu also arbitrated at international and European club level. He was selected to arbitrate matches at the 1970 World Cup, leading the Belgium – El Salvador game and being a linesman at the Israel – Sweden and Uruguay – Israel games. After he retired from his referee career, Rădulescu worked at the Romanian Football Federation, at the beginning as a simple member, afterwards being president of the Central Commission of Referees and of other federal commissions in different periods, also  managing to be president of the Romanian Football Federation in two periods, the first one was from February 1981 until July 1983 and the second was in January – February 1990.

International career
Andrei Rădulescu played 4 games, scoring 2 goals for Romania, making his debut under coach Iuliu Baratky at the 1948 Balkan Cup in a 3–2 victory against Bulgaria. His following two games were also at the 1948 Balkan Cup, playing in a 0–0 against Poland and in a 5–1 loss against Hungary. Rădulescu's last game for the national team was a friendly which ended with a 6–0 victory against Albania in which he scored two goals.

International goals
Scores and results list Romania's goal tally first, score column indicates score after each Rădulescu goal.

Honours

Club
Politehnica Timișoara
Divizia B: 1947–48
Rapid București
Divizia B: 1952

Individual
Divizia A top scorer: 1950

Notes

References

External links
 

1925 births
1992 deaths
Romanian footballers
Romania international footballers
Association football forwards
Liga I players
Liga II players
Venus București players
FC Politehnica Timișoara players
FC Rapid București players
Romanian football referees
Romanian men's basketball players
Presidents of the Romanian Football Federation
Footballers from Bucharest